Patrick MacDonald (born February 20, 1982) is a former NFL and CFL professional football player. He was signed by the New Orleans Saints as an undrafted free agent in 2007 and was the second player in the school's history to go to the NFL.  He was drafted by the Calgary Stampeders in the third round of the 2007 CFL Draft. He played college football at University of Alberta.

MacDonald has also been a member of the Carolina Panthers, Winnipeg Blue Bombers, Seattle Seahawks and Montreal Alouettes, winning a Grey Cup in 2008 and 2010.

MacDonald is now a managing director at WaveFront Capital and lives in Calgary with his wife and two children.

References

External links

1982 births
Living people
Alberta Golden Bears football players
American football defensive tackles
American football long snappers
Calgary Stampeders players
Canadian football defensive linemen
Carolina Panthers players
New Orleans Saints players
Players of Canadian football from Ontario
Seattle Seahawks players
Canadian football people from Toronto
University of Alberta alumni